Bringing It All Back Home is a 1965 Bob Dylan studio album.

Bringing It All Back Home may also refer to:

Books and TV
 Bringing It All Back Home (play), a 1969 play by Terrence McNally
 Bringing It All Back Home (TV series), a television series produced by Irish musician Philip King
 Bringing It All Back Home, a book by British writer Ian Clayton

Music
 Bringing It All Back Home, a 1991 album by Irish fiddle player Gerry O'Connor
 Bringing It All Back Home – Again, a 1999 EP by American psychedelic rock band Brian Jonestown Massacre
 Bringin' It All Back Home (Johnny Copeland album), 1985